Vladimiro Schetina Chepini (born 8 October 1955, in Asunción) is a Paraguayan former football defender. He played his club football for Club Guaraní and was also a regular international for his country, appearing in the 1986 FIFA World Cup.

International 
Schettina made his international debut for the Paraguay national football team on 17 May 1979 in a friendly match against Brazil (6-0 loss). He obtained a total number of 26 international caps, scoring two goals for the national side.

References

rsssf

1955 births
Club Guaraní players
1986 FIFA World Cup players
Living people
Paraguayan footballers
Paraguay international footballers
Sportspeople from Asunción
Association football defenders